Diasemiopsis ramburialis is a moth of the family Crambidae. It occurs in most of Europe and the tropics, including the Azores, Fiji, New Zealand and Australia. It is scarce migrant in Britain. 

The wingspan is 17–22 mm. Adults are speckled grey or brown, with two broad ragged white lines across each wing.

The larvae feed on the water fern species Azolla filiculoides.

References

Spilomelinae
Lepidoptera of Cameroon
Moths described in 1834
Moths of Africa
Moths of Asia
Moths of Australia
Moths of Europe
Moths of Japan
Moths of New Zealand
Moths of Réunion
Taxa named by Philogène Auguste Joseph Duponchel